The Babar languages are a subgroup of the Austronesian language family spoken on the Babar Islands.

Languages
West Damar
North: Dawera-Daweloor, North Babar, Dai
South
Masela – South Babar: Central Masela; East Masela, West Masela, Serili, Southeast Babar
Southwest Babar: Emplawas; Imroing, Tela-Masbuar

References